The Maine accent is the local traditional accent of Eastern New England English spoken in parts of Maine, especially along the "Down East" and "Mid Coast" seaside regions. It is characterized by a variety of features, particularly among older speakers, including r-dropping (non-rhoticity), resistance to the horse–hoarse merger, and a deletion or "breaking" of certain syllables. The traditional Maine accent is rapidly declining; a 2013 study of Portland speakers found the older horse–hoarse merger to be currently embraced by all ages; however, it also found the newer cot–caught merger to be resisted, despite the latter being typical among other Eastern New England speakers, even well-reported in the 1990s in Portland itself. The merger is also widely reported elsewhere in Maine as of 2018, particularly outside the urban areas. In the northern region of Maine along the Quebec and the New-Brunswick border, Franco-Americans may show French-language influences in their English. Certain vocabulary is also unique to Maine.

Phonology
Maine English often features phonetic change or phonological change of certain characteristics. One such characteristic is that, like in all traditional Eastern New England English, Maine English pronounces the "r" sound only when it comes before a vowel, but not before a consonant or in any final position. For example, "car" may sound to listeners like "cah" and "Mainer" like "Mainah."

Also, as in much New England English, the final "-ing" ending in multi-syllable words sounds more like "-in," for example, in stopping  and starting .

The Maine accent follows the pronunciation of Eastern New England English, like the Boston accent, but with the following additional features:
   may be a pure vowel without r-coloring, much like in British Received Pronunciation: . This makes vowel length marginally phonemic in unstressed (but not stressed) syllables, as in the near-minimal pair foreword  vs. forward . (In rhotic American English, the unstressed syllables in these two words are not distinguished.)
 Many speakers pronounce words with more than one syllable with a dipping tone. The phrase "You can't get there from here,"  coined in an episode of the mid-1900s humor stories collection Bert & I, is a quintessential example of that. This resembles one variety of the pitch accent (called the acute accent or Accent 1) found in Swedish, as in   'the wild duck'.

Lexicon
The traditional Maine dialect has a fairly rich vocabulary. Some of this vocabulary is shared with other New England dialects, however much of it is specific to Maine. This vocabulary includes, but is not limited to, the following terms:

apiece — an undetermined distance (as in "He lives down the road apiece")
ayuh  — yes; okay; sure; that's right
beater — a (beaten up) motor vehicle with value so diminished by extensive road salt corrosion there is little concern about additional collision damage from driving on icy roads
blueback trout — arctic char (Salvelinus alpinus)
bug — lobster
Kout! — a warning to be alert (Look out!)
chupta? — What are you doing? (What are you up to?)
corner — the neighborhood surrounding an intersection of rural roads (usually prefixed by the surname of an early resident of that intersection, as in "Woodfords Corner")
culch — trash or rubbish
cunning — cute (as in "She's a cunnin' one, she is")
cutter — an active child or younger person (from comparison to the harbor behavior of small, maneuverable cutters among larger ships)
dinner pail  — lunch box
dite — a tiny amount (as in "Just a dite")
divan as a generic term for couch (as opposed to the more specific, non-dialectal meaning). Derived from French.
door yard — the yard or occupant's space outside a dwelling's exterior door—sometimes decorated with ornamental plants, and often used for temporary storage of tools, toys, sleds, carts, or bicycles
Down East — loosely refers to the coastal regions of Hancock and Washington counties; because boats traveled downwind from Boston to Maine, as well as east as they travelled farther north up the coast of Maine (as in "I'm headin' Down East this weekend") - also used in Canadian English, possibly as the aforementioned Maine counties are close to parts of Atlantic Canada.
dressing — application of manure to a garden
dry-ki — an accumulation of floating dead wood on the downwind shore of a lake
fart (old faht) — an inflexibly meticulous individual
flatlander — visitor from elsewhere, often from Massachusetts due to its flat topography
gawmy — clumsy and awkward
honkin — extraordinarily large
hot top — asphaltic pavement
Italian sandwich or Italian — submarine sandwich
jimmies — colored sugar dessert sprinkles
johnny — hospital gown
kife — to steal (usually a small, useful item of low cost)
lawn sale — yard sale
nippy — cold enough to stiffen one's nipples
notional — stubborn
numb — dumb; stupid (as in "Numb son you got there")
pahtridge — ruffed grouse (Bonasa umbellus) (from partridge)
pekid — feeling unwell
pot — lobster trap 
prayer handle — knee
quahog — thick-shelled clam (Mercenaria mercenaria)

scrid — a tiny piece; a little bit
right out straight — too busy to take a break
spleeny — overly sensitive
squaretail — brook trout (Salvelinus fontinalis)
steamers — soft-shell clams (Mya arenaria)
stove in/stove up — nautical term meaning bash in (as in "Stoved all ta hell")
togue — lake trout (Salvelinus namaycush)

In popular culture
John Neal (1793–1876) was one of the first authors to feature regional American accents and colloquialisms in his writing, some of which is considered primary source material for studies on the Maine accent. His 1835 play, Our Ephraim, or The New Englanders, A What-d'ye-call-it?–in three Acts, is considered his most significant work in this regard.
Maine humorist Marshall Dodge (1935–1982) based much of his humor from the Maine dialect, beginning first with his involvement with the series Bert & I, a "Down East" collection of humor stories created during the 1950s and 1960s.
Well-known author, musician, and former television broadcaster Tim Sample is known nationally for his use of Maine vernacular.
Jud Crandall, main character in Stephen King's 1983 novel Pet Sematary, is written to have a thick Down East accent, his pronunciations often spelled phonetically throughout the novel.

References

External links
 
 
 

Maine culture
American English